Euxippe (Εὐξίππη) is an Ancient Greek given name that may refer to:

Euxippe (mythology),wife of Acraepheus,possibly the mother of Ptous
Euxippe, one of the Leuctrides